Matic Črnic (born 12 June 1992) is a Slovenian footballer who plays as a winger for TUS Heiligenkreuz.

Club career
In August 2016, Črnic joined HNK Rijeka in Croatia on a three-year deal. Following two years with the club, in June 2018, Črnic was signed by NK Olimpija Ljubljana.

Honours
Maribor
Slovenian Championship: 2008–09, 2010–11, 2011–12, 2013–14
Slovenian Cup: 2009–10, 2011–12
Slovenian Supercup: 2009, 2012, 2013, 2014

Rijeka
Croatian Championship: 2016–17
Croatian Cup: 2016–17

Olimpija Ljubljana
Slovenian Cup: 2018–19

Notes

References

External links
NZS profile 

1992 births
Living people
Sportspeople from Maribor
Association football wingers
Slovenian footballers
Slovenia youth international footballers
Slovenia under-21 international footballers
Slovenia international footballers
NK Maribor players
NK Aluminij players
NK Domžale players
HNK Rijeka players
NK Olimpija Ljubljana (2005) players
ND Gorica players
Slovenian PrvaLiga players
Slovenian Second League players
Croatian Football League players
Slovenian expatriate footballers
Expatriate footballers in Croatia
Slovenian expatriate sportspeople in Croatia
Expatriate footballers in Austria
Slovenian expatriate sportspeople in Austria